Air Niagara is a zeppelin blimp operator and formerly, a scheduled passenger airline based in the New York side of the Niagara Falls. It was one of the many airlines that started flying after the Airline Deregulation Act of 1978 in the United States. The company was acquired in early 2022 and is currently working on operating zeppelin tours.

Air Niagara offered jet flights from Niagara Falls International Airport (IAG), hoping that tourism to their home region would propel the airline to profitability.

The airline was one of the few air carriers to serve that airport with jet flights from 1982 to 1984 (in 1983, Empire Airlines (1976-1985) was also operating jet service into the airport with Fokker F28 Fellowship twin jets).  Air Niagara operated two Boeing 727-100s and was serving only  two routes in late 1982 with nonstop flights between Niagara Falls and Newark Airport (EWR) in New Jersey and also nonstop between Niagara Falls and John F. Kennedy International Airport (JFK) in New York City. The airline's 727s had been delivered new to Eastern in 1964 (both airplanes ended up being broken up in Mexico in 1994).

Air Niagara ceased operations in 1984 until the company and trademark was acquired in 2022. Air Niagara now plans on offering blimp air flights in collaboration with Hybrid Air Vehicles, a British limited company and a British manufacturer of hybrid airships.

References

External links
Air Niagara airplane photos at this Airliners.net

History of New York (state)
Airlines established in 1978
Airlines based in New York (state)